Green Mountain Transit (GMT) is the regional public transit system based in Burlington, Vermont, which was formed in 2016 through the merger of two more localized transit systems: the Chittenden County Transportation Authority and the Green Mountain Transit Authority.

Chittenden County area

Transit center and routes 
GMT's Downtown Transit Center, which generally serves local routes, is located in downtown Burlington on Saint Paul Street, between Pearl and Cherry Streets, with adjoining space along Pearl Street.  All of the commuter and express routes (36, 46, 56, 86, 96) generally operate from Pearl Street in the vicinity of Saint Paul Street.

Local routes (NextGen) 

In June 2019, pairs of local routes were combined, given color-coded route names and through-routed via the Downtown Transit Center (DTC) with new schedules; see "Former routes" below for more info. Most local routes operate seven days a week (certain holidays excluded) with 20-minute or 30-minute service patterns during the day between 6:00 AM and 7:00 PM, with weekday evening service ending at about 10:30PM.

Commuter and express routes 
Commuter and express routes operate weekday rush periods only unless otherwise noted and are limited stop.

Shopping specials 

These are shuttle buses that each operate one day per week, in the morning, to/from senior housing centers. The general public is welcome on these routes.

(*) denotes Burlington destinations

Former routes 

On June 17, 2019, GMT converted all the previously-numbered routes to colored through-routed (via the DTC) services. A short time thereafter, due to passenger feedback, GMT added the route numbers back in with the color scheme. The Red Line was composed of the 7 and 1 routes, the Blue Line with the 6 and 2, the Green Line with the 5 and 9 and the Orange Line with the 10 (and the later addition of the 4, which was originally the Silver Loop after conversion). The 8 became the Gold Loop. On June 14, 2021, due to more customer feedback, the GMT eliminated the color designations in favor of the previous numerical ones.

(NB): Northbound; (SB): Southbound

Fare schedule 
As of June 18, 2021, GMT will be fare-free for all local routes until July 2023 (due to the COVID-19 pandemic in Vermont).

(information is current as of June 17, 2019)

Starting on June 17, 2019 fares are also available for purchase in the Token Transit mobile ticketing app.

Local route fares 
$1.50 per one-way trip on local routes ($0.75 for discount qualified riders)
$15.00 for adult 10-ride pass ($7.50 for discount qualified riders)
$40.00 for adult monthly (31-day) pass ($20.00 for discount qualified riders)

Free transfers are available for those needing to connect one-way on another bus. They are not valid for round trips. UVM Medical Center employees may receive a 25% discount on LINK Express passes. University of Vermont, Saint Michael's College, Champlain College and Middlebury College students may receive free bus fare for most GMT routes. No discount fares are currently available on Local Commuter or LINK Express routes.

Local commuter fares 
$2.00 per one-way trip
$20 for adult 10-ride pass
$75 for adult monthly pass (valid on all GMT routes)

LINK Express route fares 
$4.00 per one-way trip
$40 for adult 10-ride pass
$150 for adult monthly pass (valid on all GMT routes)

The Capital District, Franklin and Grand Isle Counties, Stowe and Lamoille County, Mad River Valley areas

Route list

Fare schedule 
50% discount fares are available to children ages 6 through 17, seniors at and over the age of 60, and disabled passengers. LINK Express riders are not eligible for any discounts when riding such buses. Bus-to-bus transfers are also available, and are valid one hour after receipt and are not valid for round trips.

Capital District local routes fares 
This list includes the City Commuter route.
$1.00 per one-way trip ($0.50 for discount qualified riders)
$9.00 for adult 10-ride pass ($4.50 for discount qualified riders)
$33.00 for adult monthly pass ($15.00 for discount qualified riders)

Mad River Valley and Stowe/Lamoille 
Single local fare $1.00
10-ride pass on local routes $9.00
Unlimited ride monthly pass on local routes $33.00
Single fare between towns on commuters $2.00
Single fare within towns on commuters $1.00
10-ride pass $16.00
Monthly commuter pass $67.00
Regional seasonal routes in Stowe/Lamoille are fare free

Franklin/Grand Isle 
Single local fare $0.50
10 ride local pass $4.50
Unlimited ride monthly pass $16.50
Single fare between towns on commuters $1.00
Single fare within towns on commuters $0.50
10-ride pass $8.00
Monthly commuter pass $33.50

Fleet 

Most of the GMT fleet is made up of Gillig low-floor transit buses, although a number of older RTS transit buses remain in use, particularly on Burlington Neighborhood Special (school bus) routes. In recent years, MCI long-distance buses and various shuttle buses built on Ford E-350 chassis have been purchased for intercity routes and transit service in outlying towns, respectively.Note that this list is incomplete.

References

External links 

 

Bus transportation in Vermont